Tocane-Saint-Apre is a commune in the Dordogne department in Nouvelle-Aquitaine in southwestern France.

Population

See also
Communes of the Dordogne department
Château de Beauséjour (Tocane-Saint-Apre)

References

Communes of Dordogne